Crambe cordifolia, the greater sea-kale, colewort or heartleaf crambe ( syn. Crambe glabrata DC.), is a species of flowering plant in the family Brassicaceae, native to the Caucasus. It has gained the Royal Horticultural Society's Award of Garden Merit.

Epithet
The Latin specific epithet cordifolia, meaning "heart-shaped", refers to the leaves.

Description
Under droughty conditions the foliage depreciates. The plant is tap-rooted and resents disturbance.

References

External links
 

Brassicaceae
Plants described in 1812